The Battle of Sluis was a naval battle during the Eighty Years' War in which a Spanish squadron commanded by the Italian captain Federico Spinola tried to break through a blockade of Sluis by Dutch ships under the command of Joos de Moor. After about two hours of fighting the heavily damaged Spanish ships returned to Sluis; Federico Spinola was killed during the action.

References

Notes

Bibliography

External links
 Heldendaden der Nederlanders ter zee

Sluis 1603
Sluis
1603 in the Habsburg Netherlands
Sluis 1603
1603 in the Dutch Republic
Battles in Zeeland
Sluis
Eighty Years' War (1566–1609)